The 2023 IIHF Women's World Championship Division II comprises two international ice hockey tournaments of the 2023 Women's Ice Hockey World Championships organised by the International Ice Hockey Federation (IIHF).

The Group A tournament will be played in Mexico City, Mexico from 2 to 7 April, and the Group B tournament was played in Cape Town, South Africa, from 20 to 26 February 2023.

Group A tournament

Participants

Standings

Results
All times are local (UTC−6)

Group B tournament

Participants

Match officials
Three referees and five linesmen were selected for the tournament.

Standings

Results
All times are local (UTC+2)

Statistics

Scoring leaders
List shows the top skaters sorted by points, then goals.

GP = Games played; G = Goals; A = Assists; Pts = Points; +/− = Plus/Minus; PIM = Penalties in Minutes; POS = Position
Source: IIHF.com

Goaltending leaders
Only the top five goaltenders, based on save percentage, who have played at least 40% of their team's minutes, are included in this list.

TOI = time on ice (minutes:seconds); SA = shots against; GA = goals against; GAA = goals against average; Sv% = save percentage; SO = shutouts
Source: IIHF.com

Awards

References

2023
Division II
2023 IIHF Women's World Championship Division II
2023 IIHF Women's World Championship Division II
Sport in Mexico City
Sport in Cape Town
2023 in South African sport
IIHF
IIHF
IIHF